William Ellis Niblack (May 19, 1822 – May 7, 1893) was a politician and judge who served as a U.S. Representative from Indiana, a judge on the Indiana Supreme Court, and a member of both the Indiana Senate and the Indiana House of Representatives

Niblack was born in Dubois County, Indiana, a cousin of Silas Leslie Niblack. He attended the country schools and Indiana University at Bloomington. He studied law and was admitted to the bar in 1843 and commenced practice in Vincennes, Indiana.

He was Surveyor of Dubois County. He served as member of the Indiana House of Representatives in 1849 and 1850, and served in the Indiana Senate 1850−1853. He served as judge of the circuit court of the third judicial district from January 1854 until October 1859, when he resigned. He moved to Vincennes, Indiana, in 1855.

Niblack was elected as a Democrat to the Thirty-fifth Congress to fill the vacancy caused by the death of James Lockhart. He was reelected to the Thirty-sixth Congress and served from December 7, 1857, to March 3, 1861. He was not a candidate for renomination in 1860.
He was again a member of the Indiana House of Representatives in 1862 and 1863, and served as delegate to the Democratic National Conventions in 1864, 1868, and 1876.

Niblack was elected to the Thirty-ninth and to the four succeeding Congresses (March 4, 1865 − March 3, 1875). He was not a candidate for renomination in 1874. He resumed the practice of law and served as judge of the Indiana Supreme Court 1877−1889. He moved to Indianapolis in 1889 and retired from public life. He died in Indianapolis, Indiana, May 7, 1893 and was interred in Crown Hill Cemetery.

References

Democratic Party members of the Indiana House of Representatives
Democratic Party Indiana state senators
Justices of the Indiana Supreme Court
Burials at Crown Hill Cemetery
People from Vincennes, Indiana
1822 births
1893 deaths
Democratic Party members of the United States House of Representatives from Indiana
People from Knox County, Indiana
19th-century American politicians
19th-century American judges